A by-election was held for the Doutta Galla Province in the Victorian Legislative Council  on 30 March 1996. The by-election was caused by the vacancy following the resignation of David White, who unsuccessfully contested the lower house seat of Tullamarine.

Victorian state by-elections
1996 elections in Australia